Mount Hope Cemetery is a historic African-American cemetery and national historic district located at Raleigh, North Carolina. It was established about 1872.  The approximate total number of monuments in the cemetery is 1,454, although interment records list over 7,000 individuals. Notable contributing resources include the W. H. Matthews (1828–1902) mausoleum, the front entrance gates and gate posts (c. 1930s), and the garden cemetery landscape design.

It was listed on the National Register of Historic Places in 2009.

References

External links
 
 

African-American cemeteries
African-American history in Raleigh, North Carolina
Cemeteries on the National Register of Historic Places in North Carolina
Historic districts on the National Register of Historic Places in North Carolina
1872 establishments in North Carolina
Buildings and structures in Raleigh, North Carolina
National Register of Historic Places in Raleigh, North Carolina